Edwin Slade (March 25, 1826 – May 29, 1901) was an American businessman and politician.

Born in Westport, Massachusetts, Slade was in the boot and shoe business. In 1857, Slade moved to Wisconsin and settled in Glenbeulah, Wisconsin. He owned a general store and was in the drug and railroad business. Slade served as postmaster for Glenbeulah, Wisconsin. In 1865, Slade served in the Wisconsin State Assembly and was a Republican Party. In 1890, Slade moved to Pasadena, California. He was president of the Dillingham Manufacturing Company. He died in Pasadena, Wisconsin.

Notes

External links

1826 births
1901 deaths
People from Pasadena, California
People from Westport, Massachusetts
People from Glenbeulah, Wisconsin
Businesspeople from Massachusetts
Businesspeople from Wisconsin
Republican Party members of the Wisconsin State Assembly
Wisconsin postmasters
19th-century American politicians
19th-century American businesspeople